Nicodamus is a genus of small spiders  known from Australia. They are often referred to as the red and black spiders. As of 2017 its two species include Nicodamus peregrinus and Nicodamus mainae.

References

Spiders of Australia
Araneomorphae genera
Nicodamidae